Kalli Pashchim is a census town in Lucknow district in the Indian state of Uttar Pradesh.

References

Cities and towns in Lucknow district